Lalrampana Pauta (born 8 September 2003) is an Indian professional footballer who plays as a forward for I-League club Indian Arrows.

Club career
Born in Mizoram, Pauta began his career in the SAIL academy in Bokaro, Jharkhand.

Indian Arrows
Prior to the 2020–21 season, Pauta was announced as part of the squad for I-League side Indian Arrows, the development team for the All India Football Federation. He made his professional debut for the club on 24 January 2021 against Aizawl, coming on as an 82nd-minute substitute as Indian Arrows drew 1–1.

Career statistics

References

External links
 Profile at the All India Football Federation

2003 births
Living people
Indian footballers
Association football forwards
Indian Arrows players
I-League players
Footballers from Mizoram
India youth international footballers